In agriculture, a plowshare (US) or ploughshare (UK) is a component of a plow (or plough). It is the cutting or leading edge of a moldboard which closely follows the coulter (one or more ground-breaking spikes) when plowing.

The plowshare itself is often a hardened blade dressed into an integral moldboard (by the blacksmith) so making a unified combination of plowshare and moldboard, the whole being responsible for entering the cleft in the earth (made by the coulter's first cutting-through) and turning the earth over. 

In well-tilled terrain the plowshare may do duty without a preceding coulter.

In modern plows both coulter and plowshare are detachable for easy replacement when worn or broken.

History

Triangular-shaped stone ploughshares are found at the sites of Chinese Majiabang culture dated to 3500 BC around Lake Tai. Ploughshares have also been discovered at the nearby Liangzhu and Maqiao sites roughly dated to the same period. The British archaeologist David R. Harris says this indicates that more intensive cultivation in fixed, probably bunded, fields had developed by this time. According to Mu Yongkang and Song Zhaolin's classification and methods of use, the triangular plough assumed many kinds and were the departure from the Hemudu and Luojiajiao spade, with the Songze small plough in mid-process. The post-Liangzhu ploughs used draft animals.

In heraldry 
Ploughshares are often used in heraldry.

In ancient cultures
The ancient phrase from the biblical Book of Isaiah, "to turn swords to ploughshares," is still in common use today. These ploughshares represent peaceful use of wartime capabilities. On the other hand, the Book of Joel uses the phrase in reverse, "Beat your plowshares into swords".

However, in classical antiquity during the Battle of Marathon, many Persians were slain by a deadly ploughshare-wielding ally who appeared suddenly on the side of the ancient Athenians. After their victory and his disappearance, an oracle told the Athenians to worship the hero under the name Echetlaeus: the hero with the "echetlon", or ploughshare.

References

External links
The Rotherham Plough - the first commercially successful iron plough

Animal equipment
Agricultural machinery
Chinese inventions
Heraldic charges
Ploughs